Susta, or Šusta, is a surname. Notable people with the surname include:

Gianluca Susta (born 1956), Italian politician
Josef Šusta (1835-1914), Czech aquaculturist
Josef Šusta (racing driver), Czech racing car driver